During the 1994–95 season, Leeds United A.F.C. competed in the FA Premier League.

Season summary
Leeds United were a solid but unremarkable side for much of the 1994–95 season, but the January signing of Ghanaian striker Tony Yeboah breathed new life into a dull-but-dependable side. Leeds ended up qualifying for the UEFA Cup via the UEFA Respect Fair Play ranking.

Manager Howard Wilkinson knew that there were other parts of the Leeds set-up which needed reinforcements as well as the attack, and he used the 1995 close season to bring in experienced defenders Richard Jobson and Paul Beesley. Wilkinson was also given hope by the promise of numerous up-and-coming young players including Andy Gray, Harry Kewell and Noel Whelan. The close season also saw plans unveiled for upgrading an already-impressive Elland Road into a 65,000-seat "Wembley of the North", though it seemed very doubtful whether the ambitious plans would ever be realised.

Final league table

Results summary

Results by round

Results

Legend

FA Premier League

FA Cup

League Cup

Statistics

Transfers

In

Out

Loaned out

References

Leeds United F.C. seasons
Leeds United
Foot